A Runic calendar (also Rune staff or Runic Almanac) is a perpetual calendar, variants of which were used in Northern Europe until the 19th century. A typical runic calendar consisted of several horizontal lines of symbols, one above the other. Special days like solstices, equinoxes, and celebrations (including Christian holidays and feasts) were marked with additional lines of symbols.

Runic calendars were written on parchment or carved onto staves of wood, bone, or horn. The oldest one known, and the only one from the Middle Ages, is a staff from Nyköping, Sweden, believed to date from the 13th century. Most of the several thousand which survive are wooden calendars dating from the 16th and the 17th centuries. During the 18th century, Runic calendars had a renaissance, and calendars dating from around 1800 were made in the form of brass tobacco boxes.

The calendar is based on the 19 year-long Metonic cycle, correlating the Sun and the Moon, but the calendar does not prove knowledge of the length of the tropical year or of the occurrence of leap years. The two sliding halves are aligned and set at the beginning of each year by observing the first full moon after the first new moon after the winter solstice. The first full moon also marked the date of Disting, a pagan feast and a fair day also known as Thing of all Swedes.

Marks
On one line, 52 weeks of 7 days were laid out using 52 repetitions of the first seven runes of the Younger Futhark. The runes corresponding to each weekday varied from year to year.

On another line, many of the days were marked with one of 19 symbols representing the 19 Golden numbers, for the years of the Metonic cycle. In early calendars, each of the 19 years in the cycle was represented by a rune; the first 16 were the 16 runes of the Younger Futhark, plus three special runes improvised for the remaining three years. The new moon would fall on that day during that year of the cycle. For example, in the 18th year of the cycle, the new moons would fall on all the dates marked with tvimadur, the symbol for year 18. Later calendars used Pentadic numerals for the values 1–19.

Because this system needed 19 runes to represent the 19 golden numbers which stood for the 19 years of the perpetual calendar's cycle, the Younger Futhark was insufficient, having only 16 characters. In 1636, Ole Worm documented the Younger Futhark numeral system, including these three characters, in his Runir seu Danica literatura antiquissima (Runes: the oldest Danish literature).

A version using the Latin alphabet for weekdays and Arabic numerals for the golden numbers was printed in 1498 as part of the Breviarium Scarense.

Primstav

A primstav is the ancient Norwegian calendar stick. These were engraved with images instead of runes. The images depicted the different nonmoving religious holidays. The oldest primstav still in existence is from 1457 and is exhibited at Norsk Folkemuseum.

Modern use 
Adherents of the Estonian ethnic religion (Maausk) have published Runic calendars every year since 1978. Until 1991, the calendar was an illegal samizdat publication under the Soviet government.

See also 
 Computus Runicus
 Germanic calendar
 List of runestones
 Nationalencyklopedin
 Scythe sword
 Dominical letter

References

Further reading

External links
 
 

Obsolete calendars
Specific calendars
Calendar
Medieval runes
Modern runic writing